King and Castle is a British television crime drama series, made by Thames Television and screened on ITV, that first broadcast on 20 August 1985. The series stars Derek Martin as Ronald King, a Detective Sergeant with the Metropolitan Police, who is obliged to leave the force when he is investigated by the anti-corruption squad. His first venture outside of the police involves setting up his own Debt Collection Agency, known as 'The Manor', where he partners with mild-mannered martial arts expert David Castle (Nigel Planer).

Created by Ian Kennedy Martin, who had previously devised The Sweeney for Thames, along with Juliet Bravo and The Chinese Detective for the BBC, King and Castle started out as an episode of Thames' Storyboard, a series of stand-alone dramas intended as potential pilots for series. Described as a comibanation of the rough-and-tumble of The Sweeney with the knowing wit of Minder, two series of six episodes each followed in 1986 and 1988. In 1986, a paperback tie-in novel was also released to accompany the first series.

The complete series of King and Castle, including the Storyboard pilot, was released on DVD via Network in April 2011 and July 2012 respectively.

Cast
 Derek Martin as Ronald King
 Nigel Planer as David Castle
 Mary Healey as Miss Willmott
 Andrew Cruickshank Mr. Hodinett
 Laura Davenport as Deidre Aitken (1986)
 Rowena Roberts as Hilary McLean (1988)
 Paul Brooke as Edward Hallday-Mostyn (1986)
 Shirley Stelfox as Betty (1988)
 Lucy Speed as Susie (1988)

Episodes

Pilot (1985)

Series 1 (1986)

Series 2 (1988)

References

External links
 
 

1985 British television series debuts
1988 British television series endings
1980s British drama television series
1980s British crime television series
ITV television dramas
Television series by Fremantle (company)
Television shows produced by Thames Television
Television shows set in London
English-language television shows